The College of Liberal Arts and Sciences at ASU is the largest of the 17 independent school units at Arizona State University. Students majoring in The college make up 31 percent of all Tempe campus students.

The college is home to three academic divisions including the humanities, natural sciences and social sciences. Within these divisions The college is home to 21 interdisciplinary schools and departments and 50 research centers and institutes. The college offers 100+ undergraduate majors and 150+ graduate degrees.

As of fall 2020, The college's total student enrollment was 16,241. As of fall 2019, The college's first-year retention rate was 86%, and its four-year graduation rate was 57%.

Organization
The College of Liberal Arts and Sciences is headed by Dean Patrick Kenney. Each of the three academic divisions is led by a divisional dean:
 Dean Jeffrey Cohen, Humanities 
 Dean Kenro Kusumi, Natural Sciences

Location
The College of Liberal Arts and Sciences is located within Armstrong Hall on McAllister Avenue, as part of ASU's Tempe campus.

Notable people

Faculty* 
 Greg Asner, National Academy of Sciences (NAS) member, 2013. 
H. Russell Bernard, NAS member, 2010. 
Jane Buikstra, NAS member, 1987. 
Natalie Diaz, MacArthur Fellow, 2018; Pulitzer Prize for Poetry, 2021. 
Lindy Elkins-Tanton, NAS Arthur L. Day Prize and Lectureship, 2020; NAS member, 2021. 
James Elser, NAS member, 2019. 
Nancy Grimm, NAS member, 2019. 
Michael Goodchild, NAS member, 2002. 
Lee Hartwell, NAS member, 1987; The Nobel Prize in Physiology or Medicine, 2001.
Bert Hoelldobler, NAS member, 1998; Pulitzer Prize for General Nonfiction, 1991. 
Mitchell Jackson, Pulitzer Prize for Feature Writing, 2021. 
Michael Lynch, NAS member, 2009. 
Alexandra Navrotsky, NAS member, 1993. 
Rebecca Sandefur, MacArthur Fellow, 2018. 
Anne Stone, NAS member, 2016. 
Polly Wiessner, NAS member, 2014. 
Frank Wilczek, MacArthur Fellow, 1982; NAS member, 1990; The Nobel Prize in Physics, 2004. 
*This list includes only current and living faculty at The college who have received a Nobel Prize, Pulitzer Prize or MacArthur Fellowship or who are members of the National Academy of Sciences.

Alumni 
View outstanding and accomplished alumni at The College Alumni Network webpage: https://thecollege.asu.edu/alumni/network.

Academic Units

 Aerospace Studies
 American Indian Studies
 Department of English
 Department of Physics
 Department of Psychology
 Hugh Downs School of Human Communication
 Military Science
 Naval Science
 School of Civic and Economic Thought and Leadership
 School of Earth and Space Exploration
 School of Geographical Sciences and Urban Planning
 School of Historical, Philosophical and Religious Studies
 School of Human Evolution and Social Change
 School of International Letters and Cultures
 School of Life Sciences
 School of Mathematical and Statistical Sciences
 School of Molecular Sciences
 School of Politics and Global Studies
 School of Social and Family Dynamics
 School of Social Transformation
 School of Transborder Studies

Research Centers and Institutes

 American Indian Policy Institute 
 Arizona Center for Medieval and Renaissance Studies 
 Beyond: Center for Fundamental Concepts in Science 
 Biodiversity Knowledge Integration Center 
 Center for Archaeology and Society 
 Center for Asian Research 
 Center for Behavior, Institutions and the Environment 
 Center for Bioarchaeological Research 
 Center for Biodiversity Outcomes 
 Center for Bioenergy and Photosynthesis 
 Center for Biological Physics 
 Center for Biology and Society 
 Center for Child and Family Success 
 Center for Digital Antiquity
 Center for Education Through Exploration 
 Center for Evolution and Medicine 
 Center for Gender Equity in Science and Technology 
 Center for Global Discovery 
 Center for Global Health 
 Center for Imagination in the Borderlands 
 Center for Indian Education 
 Center for Jewish Studies 
 Center for Meteorite Studies 
 Center for Political Thought and Leadership 
 Center for Public Humanities
 Center for Social Dynamics and Complexity 
 Center for Strategic Communication 
 Center for the Advanced Study and Practice of Hope 
 Center for the Study of Economic Liberty 
 Center for the Study of Institutional Diversity 
 Center for the Study of Religion and Conflict 
 Center for Work and Democracy 
 Center on the Future of War 
 Chinese Language Flagship Center 
 Desert Humanities Initiative 
 Global Drylands Center 
 Hispanic Research Center 
 Humanities Lab 
 Institute for Humanities Research 
 Institute for Social Science Research 
 Institute of Human Origins 
 Interplanetary Initiative 
 Lincoln Center for Applied Ethics 
 Melikian Center: Russian, Eurasian and East European Studies 
 Project Humanities 
 REACH Institute 
 Simon A. Levin Mathematical, Computational and Modeling Sciences Center
 Spatial Analysis Research Center 
 Urban Climate Research Center
 Virginia G. Piper Center for Creative Writing

Rankings
The following rankings are for Arizona State University overall. Rankings directly connected to disciplines and programs within The College of Liberal Arts and Sciences are listed.

Higher Education Research and Development Rankings (fiscal year 2018): 
 No. 1 in geological and earth sciences.
No. 1 in anthropology.
No. 4 in social sciences.
No. 5 in humanities.
No. 5 in political science and government.
U.S. News & World Report (2021):

 No. 10 in undergraduate teaching
 No. 10 in first-year experiences

4+1/Accelerated Programs at The College
Accelerated (4+1) degree programs streamline a student's path from an undergraduate program to a master's degree. By combining undergraduate and graduate coursework in their senior year for dual credit, students can potentially save up to an entire year of schooling and receive both degrees in as little as five years. Students can view available pathways at the accelerated degrees (4+1) website: https://thecollege.asu.edu/degrees/accelerated. This website is updated regularly as new accelerated (4+1) degree options are added.

References

External links 
 

Arizona State University
Liberal arts colleges at universities in the United States